The 1994 Spanish Grand Prix was a Formula One motor race held on 29 May 1994 at the Circuit de Catalunya, Montmeló. It was the 36th Spanish Grand Prix and the fourth to be held at the Circuit de Catalunya, and the fifth race of the 1994 Formula One World Championship.

The 65-lap race was won by Englishman Damon Hill, driving a Williams-Renault. It was the first victory of the season for Hill and the Williams team, who were still recovering from the death of Ayrton Senna at Imola four weeks previously. Hill won by 24 seconds from German driver and championship leader Michael Schumacher, whose Benetton-Ford was stuck in fifth gear for most of the race. Another Englishman, Mark Blundell, finished third in a Tyrrell-Yamaha, which would turn out to be the final podium finish for him and the Tyrrell team.

The Grand Prix was additionally notable for the season-ending crash of debutant Italian driver Andrea Montermini in his Simtek S941 on the front straight. Montermini, elevated from test driver status after the death of Roland Ratzenberger at the San Marino Grand Prix crashed heavily into the pit wall. It also marked the Formula One debut of Scottish driver David Coulthard, replacing Senna for Williams. The new Lotus 109 made its debut this weekend replacing the two-year-old 107.

Report

Pre-race 

This was the first race for the newly formed Grand Prix Drivers Association (GPDA). Several top level names, including Michael Schumacher, Damon Hill, and Gerhard Berger, were instrumental in the setup and running of the GPDA, and they took the decision to install a temporary chicane before the Nissan corner. This was an attempt to improve safety, as well as limit speeds around the track, as the Nissan corner was generally taken at near flat-out speeds.

Sauber entered only one car for this race due to Karl Wendlinger's injury at the previous race.

Qualifying 
Michael Schumacher took the second pole position in succession and the second of his career. Damon Hill also lined up on the front row, his time had been beaten by Schumacher's by over half a second, and he was only one thousandth of a second ahead of Mika Häkkinen. The pair's respective Williams and McLaren teammates lined up eighth and ninth, McLaren's Martin Brundle on the fourth row in front of a disappointed David Coulthard for Williams. Schumacher's Benetton teammate – JJ Lehto – had done a bit better for himself and lined up fourth. Rubens Barrichello's Jordan qualified in fifth, followed by the two Ferraris. Tyrrell driver Ukyo Katayama was the other driver in the top ten, while at the back Andrea Montermini crashed heavily in the Simtek previously driven by Roland Ratzenberger and broke his ankles. He thus did not set a timed lap in the second session, and failed to qualify, although he would have been unable to start the race anyway.

Race 
Olivier Beretta retired when his Larousse-Ford's engine failed on the formation lap. Schumacher led from pole position at the start of the race whilst Barrichello and Berger collided at the first corner. Neither driver retired as a direct result of the collision, although both did eventually, but Berger was forced to run across the grass and lost places and would eventually retire on lap 28 with gearbox problems.
Coulthard climbed up to fifth place from his ninth place starting spot, but his car stalled in the pits on lap 16. Despite retiring from twelfth place on lap 32 with electrical problems, he described his race as a "good debut overall". While Williams notched up their first victory of the season, and first after the death of Ayrton Senna, championship leader Michael Schumacher finished a strong second, despite being stuck in fifth gear for most of the race. Knowing that he had a major problem, he managed to make a pitstop (and get away from the pit stop in 5th gear), and as the race unfolded gave nothing to the leading Hill's pace. He had to change his driving style to find new trajectories and corner apexes, and his past experience as a World Sports Car driver helped him to do so. Meanwhile Rubens Barrichello retired after he spun off near the pit entry on lap 40 and Schumacher was once again able to make a pitstop and not stall the car. After the pit stops, Mika Häkkinen was in third place for McLaren behind Hill and Schumacher, having temporarily been in front of Schumacher earlier in the race. Häkkinen's engine failed as did JJ Lehto's Benetton-Ford engine 5 laps after Hakkinen on lap 54, though granting the place to Hakkinen's teammate Martin Brundle. Brundle then retired himself after a transmission explosion from the back of his car at the first corner by lap 60 and was classified 11th. Mark Blundell, for Tyrrell, completed the podium celebrations, scoring his 3rd and last podium of his career.

Post-race 
After the race, the Williams team were very emotional with Hill's win.

Classification

Qualifying

Race

Championship standings after the race

Drivers' Championship standings

Constructors' Championship standings

References

Spanish Grand Prix
Spanish Grand Prix
Grand Prix
Spanish Grand Prix